Franártur Duque (August 20, 1983, Venezuela) is a Colombian-Venezuelan actor, comedian and producer. He has been a part of different audiovisual productions in mediums such as television, advertising, cinema, web, video clips, short films, advertising spots and sketches, where in addition to acting he has also worked as a screenwriter, producer and director.

The artist lived his first years of life and academic training between Colombia and Venezuela. He fulfilled his university studies in the city of Caracas, where he graduated from the School of Social Communication, mention Audiovisual Arts of the Andres Bello Catholic University (Caracas).

Career

First years 
He made his debut in 2003 as a live comedian, with "La Degeneración de Relevo" (Relay Degeneration), this was a collective of comedians, created by Laureano Márquez and Emilio Lovera, during the starts of Stand Up Comedy in Venezuela.

In addition to his career he has created several characters to develop his style of humor in the roles he plays in the audiovisual industry. The most relevant in his career in Venezuela is "Butaquito"; This was a caricature created by him in 2005 for the program Vamos al cine, broadcast on an open signal by Venevisión for two years.

He also participated as an assistant director, copywriter and screenwriter in advertising productions and entertainment content.

Posterior career 
Since 2012, Franártur Duque is located in the city of Bogotá, where he has participated in important productions for RCN, Caracol TV, City TV, Sony, Univisión and others. Between the most outstanding productions there are: Who Killed Patricia Soler (Quien Mató a Patricia Soler), the Corner of the Devil (La Esquina del Diablo), Pambelé, Room of Urgencies 2 (Sala de Urgencias), The Commander (El Comandante) and Paradise Travel (Paraíso Travel).

Comedy Content Creator 
During 2004–2006 he was director, screenwriter and producer of the television program Vamos al Cine, in turn he was director of short films like Sordomudo, Paramedicos, Miguel y el Fuego, Alarmanecer, Activista La Flor, En 4, Los Gaffer, Amor Inflatable, CucaTanaca in Tokyo and Rapicui.

In 2013 he was the scriptwriter of the second season of the DirectTV program "Andres Lopez de Noche", along with other talents such as Juan Buenaventura, Lina Mayorga, Chóche Román and Juan Camilo Vergarahttps://archive.org/details/ALDNCredits.

Currently Franártur Duque has eight routines of his authorship: Adolescence without cause, The seed of hatred 1 and 2, Experiment of the absurd, Childhood, Marriage and sex, Bad days and A normal guy.

Productions

References

Venezuelan male television actors
1983 births
Living people
21st-century Venezuelan male actors